The Hamburg Freezers were a German professional men's ice hockey club from Hamburg, Germany that played in the Deutsche Eishockey Liga. The club announced its withdrawal from the DEL and ceased operations on 24 May 2016 when Anschutz Entertainment Group, who owned both the Freezers and Eisbären Berlin, felt it was no longer financially viable to own two teams within the same hockey league.

The Freezers were originally known as the Munich Barons from 1999 until 2002, before team owner Philip Anschutz relocated the franchise to Hamburg for financial reasons on 3 June 2002. The club was renamed as the Hamburg Freezers. Their German nickname was Eisschränke (iceboxes).

The team's official colours were crystal blue and white and they played their home games in the Barclaycard Arena Hamburg.

Goaltender Jean-Sébastien Giguère suited up for the Freezers during the 2004–05 NHL lockout season. Giguère played six games for Hamburg and posted a .925 save percentage, with a goals against average of 2.39.

During the 2012–13 NHL lockout, Dallas Stars forward Jamie Benn lined up for the Freezers in 19 games, amassing 7 goals and 13 assists, earning him a player of the month award for November.

History
The Hamburg Freezers were founded in 2002, when the Munich Barons franchise was moved to Hamburg in northern Germany. The reason for the move was due to low turnouts and financial issues; Munich Barons had an average turnout of under 3,000 spectators, even though the team were crowned league champions in 2000. Despite being the second biggest city in Germany, Hamburg had no representation in the country's top league and was chosen as the next destination for the franchise.

In their first season, the attendance average rose to over 5,000 and the team finished in 8th place, making it through to the playoff quarter finals.

In the next 10 years, attendance figures continued to grow and the average attendance in 2011–12 was over 9,200. In its final season before the club's demise, 2015–16, the club was the fourth-best supported team in German ice hockey and the tenth-best in Europe.

The club was a perennial playoff team, though it never won a DEL championship.

In May 2016, team owner Philip Anschutz announced that the team would no longer be supported under his company Anschutz Entertainment Group. The Freezers were given a deadline of 24 May 2016 to find a buyer and new sponsorship, which was unable to be met, ceasing the operations of the club.

Rivals
Most of the DEL teams are based in the south and south west of the country, meaning there were very few local rivals for Hamburg. However, the Freezers did enjoy 'northern derbies' against two other franchises; Grizzly Adams Wolfsburg and Hannover Scorpions, while the team's main rivals were Eisbären Berlin, who are also owned by Philip Anschultz.

Mascot
The Hamburg Freezers mascot was Stanley the Lion, 'cousin' of Bailey the Lion of the Los Angeles Kings, another club owned by Anschutz Entertainment Group.

Season records

References

External links

Official website

 
Ice hockey teams in Germany

Sport in Hamburg
Ice hockey clubs established in 1999
Ice hockey clubs established in 2002
Anschutz Corporation
Ice hockey clubs disestablished in 2016
1999 establishments in Germany
2016 disestablishments in Germany